Lchavan is a village in the Vardenis Municipality of the Gegharkunik Province of Armenia, located to the southeast of Lake Sevan.

History 
The village has Bronze Age tombs and a church dating to the 13th-14th century with khachkars.

References

External links 

Populated places in Gegharkunik Province